Nights Like This may refer to:

Music

Albums and EPs
 Nights Like This (album), 1989 album by Stacey Q
 Nights Like This, 2014 album by Eli "Paperboy" Reed
Nights Like This, 2011 EP by Icona Pop

Songs
 "Nights Like This", song by After 7
 "Nights Like This" (Kehlani song), 2019
 "Nights Like This", song by Icona Pop from the album Icona Pop, 2012

See also
 Night Like This (disambiguation)
 A Night Like This (disambiguation)